Hjellum is a village in Hamar Municipality in Innlandet county, Norway. Prior to 1992, Hjellum was a part of Vang municipality.

Hjellum Station was a former station on the Rørosbanen railway. It has a small coking factory; the area around it has several coal mines.

References

Hamar
Villages in Innlandet